The Caproni Ca.314 was an Italian twin-engine attack/torpedo bomber aircraft, used in World War II.

Derived from the similar Ca.310, the Ca.314 was used mainly for ground attack and torpedo bomber missions. It was the most extensively-built Ca.310 derivative, and included variants dedicated to light bomber, convoy escort/maritime patrol, torpedo bomber, and ground-attack.

Design and development

Operational history

Variants

Ca 314A 
Light bomber.
Ca 314-SC (Scorta) 
Convoy escort, maritime patrol aircraft, 73  built.
Ca 314B 
Torpedo bomber aircraft. Also known as the Ca 314-RA, 80 built.
Ca 314C
Ground-attack aircraft, 254 built.

Operators
  
 Regia Aeronautica

Italian Air Force
 
 Hungarian Air Force

Specifications (Ca.314A)

See also

References

Ca.314
1940s Italian bomber aircraft
Low-wing aircraft
Aircraft first flown in 1940
Twin piston-engined tractor aircraft